Prince Louis Thomas of Savoy (Italian: Luigi Tommaso di Savoia; 15 December 1657 – 14 August 1702) was a Count of Soissons and  Prince of Savoy. He was killed as Feldzeugmeister of the Imperial Army at the Siege of Landau at the start of the War of the Spanish Succession.

Biography
Louis Thomas was the eldest son of Eugene Maurice, Count of Soissons and Olympia Mancini, as well as the oldest brother of Prince Eugene of Savoy. He married Uranie de La Cropte de Beauvais, whom Saint-Simon had once described as "radiant as the glorious morn". His daughter Princess Maria Anna Victoria of Savoy eventually inherited Eugene's estate.  His maternal cousins included the  Duke of Vendôme as well as the Duke of Bouillon and  Louis Henri de La Tour d'Auvergne. His paternal cousins included Victor Amadeus I, Prince of Carignano and  Louis William, Margrave of Baden-Baden.  

After the death of his father and the flight of his mother to Brussels due to her involvement in the notorious Poison affair, Louis Thomas and Urania were charged, along with his paternal grandmother, with the rearing of his younger brothers. Eugene was never to forget the couple's loving surrogate parentage.

Louis Thomas obtained a commission as an officer in the French Army, but Louis XIV had amorous designs on his wife. Urania, however, spurned the king's romantic advances. Angered, Louis dismissed Louis Thomas from the army, and, when Louis Thomas sought a position abroad, terminated his pension and dues. In 1699, all but bankrupt, Louis Thomas sought the aid of his younger brother, Eugene, in Vienna. With Eugene's help, he obtained a commission in the Austrian Imperial Army. 

On 18 August Louis was killed by a French bomb at the Siege of Landau at the onset of the War of the Spanish Succession.

Issue
 Princess Maria Anna Victoria of Savoy (1683–1763), Mademoiselle de Soissons; married Prince Joseph of Saxe-Hildburghausen, Duke in Saxony, son of Ernest, Duke of Saxe-Hildburghausen; had no issue.
 Prince Louis Thomas of Savoy (1685–1695)
  Princess Thérèse Anne Louise of Savoy (1686–1736); never married and had no issue.
 Prince Emmanuel Thomas of Savoy (1687–1729); succeeded as Count of Soissons. He married Princess Maria Theresia of Liechtenstein and had issue.
 Prince Maurice of Savoy (1690–1710)
 Prince Eugene of Savoy (1692–1712)

Ancestry

References

1657 births
1702 deaths
Louis Thomas
Counts of Soissons
Italian military personnel
Burials at the Basilica of Superga
Candidates for the Polish elective throne
Place of birth unknown
Dukes of Carignan